Public Schools of Petoskey is a school district headquartered in Petoskey, Michigan.

History

Chris Parker served as superintendent until his 2022 resignation. The employees partook in a survey, and the survey concluded that 90% of the employees perceived serious problems to be present in the culture of the school district. The school board made a plan in response to the survey finds and Parker's departure.

In 2022 Jeffrey Leslie became the superintendent. He was selected out of three interviewed candidates, which in turn were out of ten applicants.

District boundary
In Emmet County the district includes, in addition to Petoskey: Bay View, Conway, and a portion of Oden. Townships include Bear Creek Township, Resort Township, Springvale Township, and sections of Little Traverse Township and Littlefield Township. A portion of the district is in Charlevoix County, where it includes Walloon Lake. Townships covered include portions of Chandler Township, Hayes Township, and Melrose Township.

Schools
 Secondary schools
 Petoskey High School
 Petoskey Middle School

 Elementary schools
 Central Elementary School
 Lincoln Elementary School
 Ottawa Elementary School
 Sheridan Elementary School
 Montessori School

References

External links
 Public Schools of Petoskey

Education in Emmet County, Michigan
Education in Charlevoix County, Michigan
School districts in Michigan